Jeanette Vogelbacher Solbach (2 February 1922 – 10 November 2018) was a French gymnast. She competed at the 1948 Summer Olympics and the 1952 Summer Olympics. She was a member of the French team that took the silver at the 1950 World Championships in Basel. She was the French champion in 1948, 1949, and 1950. She was married to fellow Olympian Amand Solbach, who died in 1967.

References

1922 births
2018 deaths
French female artistic gymnasts
Olympic gymnasts of France
Gymnasts at the 1948 Summer Olympics
Gymnasts at the 1952 Summer Olympics
20th-century French women